Edwin Miller may refer to:

 Edwin A. Miller (1857–1913), Wisconsin politician
 Edwin E. Miller (1883/1884–1949), New York politician